The Francisco Josephinum Secondary College and Research Institute (HBLFA) in Wieselburg is a secondary school for agriculture in Austria. Founded more than 100 years ago, it has been situated at Weinzierl Castle in Wieselburg since 1934.

The school is divided into three departments: Agriculture, Agricultural Engineering, Food Technology and Biotechnology.

External links
 HBLFA Francisco Josephinum Official Website

Schools in Austria
Agricultural universities and colleges in Austria